Kenneth Leslie Tattersall Jackson (17 November 1913 – 21 March 1982) was a Scottish first-class cricketer and Scotland international rugby union player.

Jackson was born at Shanghai in November 1913. He was educated in England at Rugby School, before going up to Trinity College, Oxford.

Cricket career

Amateur career

While studying at Oxford, he played first-class cricket for Oxford University in 1934–35, making nine appearances. 

Jackson scored 181 runs in his nine matches, at an average of 12.92, with a high score of 33. 

With his right-arm fast-medium bowling, he took 29 wickets at a bowling average of 30.13. He took one five wicket haul, with best figures of 5 for 66 against Worcestershire.

Provincial career

While teaching at Wellington College, Jackson also played minor counties cricket for Berkshire, making two appearances either side of the Second World War.

Rugby Union career

Amateur career

Jackson played for Oxford University.

Provincial career

Jackson was named in the Scotland Probables side on 13 January 1934. Batting for selection, was his opponent on the Scotland Possibles side James Cotter from Hillhead HSFP.

The Aberdeen Press and Journal noted that day:
Cotter is a player of exceptional merit, he has, indeed, that quality all-roundness which seems to characterise all great players. A grand fullback, clever centre, he is also an accomplished stand-off half. Jackson will require to be his best to outshine Cotter.

International career

Jackson represented Scotland while a student, playing as a fly half in four Test matches in the 1933 and 1934 Home Nations Championship's.

Teaching career

After graduating from Oxford, Jackson became a schoolmaster at Wellington College, Berkshire.

Military career

He served in the Second World War with the Duke of Wellington's Regiment, being conscripted in October 1940, with promotion to the war substantive rank of lieutenant coming in January 1941. Following the war, he gained the war substantive rank of captain, before relinquishing his commission in December 1946.

Death

He died at Hinton St George in March 1982.

References

External links

1913 births
1982 deaths
Sportspeople from Shanghai
People educated at Rugby School
Alumni of Trinity College, Oxford
Scottish rugby union players
Scotland international rugby union players
Scottish cricketers
Oxford University cricketers
Scottish schoolteachers
Berkshire cricketers
Duke of Wellington's Regiment officers
British Army personnel of World War II
Oxford University RFC players
Scotland Probables players